Paul Gabrillagues (born 3 June 1993) is a French rugby union player. His position is lock and he currently plays for Stade Français in the Top 14.

International career

International tries

References

External links
France profile at FFR
Stade Français profile
L'Équipe profile

1993 births
Living people
French rugby union players
Stade Français players
Rugby union locks
France international rugby union players